The Kymi Province was a province of Finland from 1945 to 1997.

The Kymi Province was the remainder of the territory from the Viipuri Province after the main part was left to Russia at the Moscow Armistice in 1944. By the Paris Peace Treaty in 1947, territories on the Karelian Isthmus and around of the Lake Ladoga were formally ceded to the Soviet Union.

In 1997, the Kymi Province was merged with the Uusimaa Province and the southern parts of the Häme Province into the new Southern Finland Province.

Maps

Municipalities in 1997 (cities in bold) 

 Anjalankoski
 Elimäki
 Hamina
 Iitti
 Imatra
 Jaala
 Joutseno
 Kotka
 Kouvola
 Kuusankoski
 Lappeenranta
 Lemi
 Luumäki
 Miehikkälä
 Parikkala
 Pyhtää
 Rautjärvi
 Ruokolahti
 Saari
 Savitaipale
 Suomenniemi
 Taipalsaari
 Uukuniemi
 Valkeala
 Vehkalahti
 Virolahti
 Ylämaa

Former municipalities (disestablished before 1997) 

 Anjala
 Haapasaari
 Jääski
 Karhula
 Kymi
 Lappee
 Lauritsala
 Nuijamaa
 Simpele
 Sippola
 Säkkijärvi
 Vahviala

Governors 
 Arvo Manner 1945–1955
 Artturi Ranta 1955–1964
 Esko Peltonen 1965–1975
 Erkki Huurtamo 1975–1984
 Matti Jaatinen 1984–1993
 Mauri Miettinen 1993–1997

Provinces of Finland (1917–97)
States and territories established in 1945
1945 establishments in Finland
1997 disestablishments in Finland